Rake. was an art rock/noise rock musical ensemble from Northern Virginia (near Washington, DC), founded in 1989. Not aligned with the post-punk/hardcore bands more commonly associated with the local underground music scene, Rake. took a more experimental route and were more closely associated with fellow Virginia-based bands Pelt and Wingtip Sloat. Throughout the 1990s, a relationship cemented via their principal label, VHF Records.

Band members Jim Ayre (a.k.a. Vinnie Van Go-Go or OASTEM!), Bill Kellum, and Carl Moller (a.k.a. C-Man) released their first record in 1989, a 7” 45 rpm single called "Cow Song" and the follow-up EP "Motorcycle Shoes" in 1990. The punkish leanings on these recordings were soon superseded by more experimental offerings such as the cassette "The Day I Remembered Seeing Ice" and the LP Rake Is My Co-Pilot, the latter featuring a sidelong extemporization on the lead song from the "Motorcycle Shoes" EP.  The band's early recordings featured (mostly shouted) vocals, but the band's later work was generally instrumental in nature. Although Rake.'s main instruments were electric guitar, bass and drums, they made liberal use of tape loops, synthesizers, static, and anything else they saw fit.  The band's sound reached a highbrow, minimalistic/ambient peak on 1998 album Resume The Cosmos, which was released by Australian label Camera Obscura but their aesthetic is best summed up by their double CD release The Art Ensemble of Rake/The Tell-Tale Moog which combined lengthy improvisations with found sounds, field recordings and harsh edits. The second disc was largely indexed at 60-second intervals, regardless of the musical content, although one 5-second section was simply a recording of a male voice saying, "Look out: rattlesnake!".

Often wilfully mysterious (to the point of providing misinformation, particularly through the OASTEM! website), Rake. released a steady stream of vinyl singles, CDs, cassettes and later CDR's, mostly on the label VHF. However, they were never a touring act, only performing intermittently around the Virginia/ Maryland area. Although they never formally split and members of the band continue to work together, only archive material has been released during this decade.

OASTEM!
OASTEM! is a word invented by Rake. that appears in various album and song titles by the band, although its exact meaning has never been revealed. It may be used in several ways: as a greeting or as a way of saying good-bye; as an exclamation of satisfaction; or as a reference to cosmological and mystical phenomenon. It is also the name of a web site (www.oastem.com) containing mp3 downloads of rare and previously unreleased music involving Rake. members. Included are early cassettes such as "The Day I Remembered Seeing Ice" and "Shock Tart Chew Up" as well as more recent recordings under other names or by single members. An early version of the web site included the following greeting: "OASTEM! You have landed upon a web site devoted to the exploration of the Sound of Peace and Harmony that is expressed through OASTEM! Discuss OASTEM! Receive OASTEM! Achieve an understanding of the message that has captured the imagination of a generation."

Additional information
The stage name Vinnie Van Go-Go is a pun on Vincent van Gogh and go-go dancing.
It was rumored that the band chose its name from indie rock "supergroup" Velvet Monkeys' album Rake, which was released on Rough Trade Records in 1989, about a year before Rake's first single. There was also a reference to Velvet Monkeys member Don Fleming on the first Rake 45. However, in 1993, the band told UK magazine Grim Humour that their name was chosen before becoming aware of the album and also that the final decision on their name had been taken by Kellum, who had designed the sleeve to "Cow Song".
 Several titles were puns on well-known musical and cultural references: Rake Is My Co-Pilot is a pun on the name of the queercore band God Is My Co-Pilot, Art Ensemble Of Rake is a pun on the name of experimental jazz collective Art Ensemble of Chicago and The Tell-Tale Moog is a pun on the Edgar Allan Poe short story "The Tell-Tale Heart." In addition, *The cover art of the Fighting 2 Quarters And A Nickel double live CD is a modification of the cover of rebel organist Virgil Fox's early-'70s live album Heavy Organ.

Discography

Studio albums
Rake Is My Co-Pilot (VHF, 1994)
The Art Ensemble of Rake/The Tell-Tale Moog (VHF, 1995)
G-Man (Squealer, 1996)
Resume the Cosmos (Camera Obscura, 1998)
Ginseng Nights (VHF, 2002)
Omniverse .:. Frequency (VHF, 2002)

Cassette albums
The Day I Remembered Seeing Ice (Sweet Portable Junket, 1992)
Shock Tart Chew Up (Chocolate Monk, 1993)
Rake Live at the 15 Minutes Art Gallery (1994)

Live albums
Fighting 2 Quarters and a Nickel (VHF, 1998)

EPs
Motorcycle Shoes/Look at Rocks/My Miserable Existence/The Center (VHF, 1991)

Singles
Cow Song/My Fish Died (L Records, 1990)
Subterranean Marijuana Garden/U.S. TV (VHF, 1992)
Squelch/Phrase Text Slur (Fourth Dimension, 1995)
Art Ensemble of Rake (Carlophonics)/The Tell-Tale Moog (Carlophonics) (VHF, 1996)

External links
VHF Records Record label run by Kellum
[ Allmusic entry]
Rake's Facebook Page 
Rake.info at archive.org

American noise rock music groups